Deep-water soloing (DWS), also known as psicobloc, is a form of solo rock climbing that relies solely upon the presence of water at the base of a climb to protect against injury from falls from the generally high-difficulty routes. While typically practiced on sea cliffs at high tide, it can also be done on climbs above reservoirs, rivers, and even swimming pools.  Often a dinghy or other small boat is kept on scene to pick up the fallen climber, as a fall from a taller route can still pose the risk of being knocked unconscious on impact with the water, which could lead to drowning. Pioneers include Miquel Riera, Tim Emmett, Klem Loskot, and Chris Sharma.

History

Deep-water soloing has its roots in Mallorca when in 1978, Miquel Riera became frustrated with the aid climbing routes in his local area so he went to Porto Pi, Palma with his friends Jaume Payeras, Eduardo Moreno, and Pau Bover to find routes they could free climb. This became Mallorca's first bouldering venue, and as time progressed, Riera moved onto the nearby sea cliffs where they established DWS routes. Riera and his companions named it "psicobloc" (translated into English, means "Psycho Bouldering"), and published articles and photographs in climbing magazines on their activities. Towards the end of the 1980s Miquel, aided by Pepino Lopez, Xisco Meca, Pepe Link, and Miki Palmer, had discovered the short sea cliffs of Cala Barques, Cala Serena, and a particularly impressive cliff in Porto Cristo, which was to become known as Cova del Diablo. Three notable routes were established at Cova del Diablo: Surfing in the Bar, Surfer Dead, and Surfing Bird.

The 1990s saw an explosion in Britain for what they called "Deep Water Soloing" (DWS), which began with Nick Buckley's ascent of The Conger (1983). Britain's southern coast saw new routes established by the Cook brothers, Mike Robertson, Steve Taylor, and Pete Oxley.  In 1996, the British Climbers' Club, published Into the Blue: A guide to Deep Water Soloing in Dorset, which became the first-ever DWS guidebook in the world, and proposed an evolved grading system and climbing style to Britain.  In 2001, British climber Tim Emmett received an email from Miquel showing Cova Del Diablo and led to a trip by Emmett that included other leading climbers such as Mike Robertson, Neil Gresham, and Austrian Klem Loskot.  Within a week they had established over twenty-six routes ranging from 4+ to 8a, bringing the total on Cova Del Diablo twenty-nine. In February 2002, Mike Robertson published an article titled 'Sympathy for the Devil' in the British magazine Climber, describing Cova Del Diablo along with details and route guides of all twenty-nine lines on the cliff.

The publication of Robertson's article led to more international teams coming to Cova Del Diablo to create additional routes and explore new Mallorcan cliffs such as Cala Sa Nau, Cala Barques, Cala Mitjana, and Porto Cristo Novo.  These teams also introduced Dutch climber Toni Lamprecht to Mallorcan DWS, which resulted in a vast number of new lines being established, chiefly at Cala Barques.  DWS became more mainstream and globally recognised amongst climbers when a couple of short films were made by climbing filmmakers such as Udo Neumann in 2001, and Josh and Brett Lowell in 2003.  The films featured some of the sport's pioneers: Emmett, Lamprecht, Klem Loskot, and a newcomer to the style, Chris Sharma.

In September 2006, the world of DWS changed forever when Chris Sharma completed the right-hand finish to the line that climbed the underside of the dramatic Es Pontàs on the southeastern part of Mallorca, and carried a grade of 9a+ (5.15a), the hardest ever DWS grade. Sharma had been looking for a DWS-equivalent to his 2001 sport climb, Realization (9a+, 5.15a), and his first ascent is featured in Josh Lowell and Peter Mortimer's 2007 film King Lines. In 2007, Mike Robinson published a global DWS guide titled Deep Water, further promoting the sport, and the major locations around the world.

Locations
DWS is notably practiced on the coasts of Mallorca in Spain (and the Cova del Diablo cliffs in particular), in Sardinia (Italy), in Dorset, Devon, and around the Southern Pembrokeshire coast in Britain, in the Calanques near Marseille in France, and in the sea cliffs of Ailladie in Ireland.  Additionally, climbers have found outlets for deep water soloing among the aquatic karst topography of southeast Asia; notable areas include Tonsai, in Thailand, and Ha Long Bay, in Vietnam.

Notable ascents 

:
 Es Pontàs, Mallorca (ESP), September 26, 2006.  First ascent by Chris Sharma. Repeated by Jernej Kruder in November 2016. It features a  dyno that took Sharma over 50 attempts to stick.

:
 Alasha, Mallorca (ESP), September 23, 2016.  First ascent by Chris Sharma, who estimated its grade based on the effort it took to climb it without a rope: "If it had bolts on it, it probably wouldn’t be a 9b (5.15b). But when you’re 60 feet up with no bolts, it takes the same amount of effort.” Sharma named the route after his daughter, Alana Sharma.

Books

See also

Free solo
Solo climbing

References

Types of climbing
Articles containing video clips
Free solo climbing